Eremothecella is a genus of lichenized fungi in the family Arthoniaceae. The genus is widespread in tropical areas, and contains six species.

References

Arthoniaceae
Arthoniomycetes genera
Lichen genera
Taxa named by Hans Sydow
Taxa named by Paul Sydow